Shave ice or Hawaiian shave ice is an ice-based dessert made by shaving a block of ice and flavoring it with syrup and other sweet ingredients. On the Big Island of Hawai'i, it is also referred to as "ice shave." In contrast, a snow cone, a similar American dessert, is made with crushed ice rather than shaved ice. The thin ice shavings of shave ice allow for the flavored syrups to be absorbed completely instead of sinking to the bottom. Hawaiian shave ice is derived from a similar ice-based dessert from Japan called kakigōri and thus involves similar production methods.

Shave ice is characteristically served in a conical paper or plastic cup with flavored syrups poured over the top with additional elements like ice cream, azuki beans, or condensed milk. Shave ice syrups in Hawaii are often flavored with local ingredients such as guava, pineapple, coconut cream, passionfruit, li hing mui (salty dried Chinese plums), lychee, kiwifruit, and mango.

Many global variants of ice-based desserts that are similar to Hawaiian shave ice can be found in a number of different countries.

History

Japan 
The history of Hawaiian shave ice can be traced back to one particular ice-based dessert that originates from Japan’s Heian period, which spans the 8th century through 12th century, A.D. This dessert is known as kakigōri and was once reserved for the wealthy because of the complex production process of ice, which was only accessible in the winter and refrigeration relied on natural sources like ice houses.

During the early 1900s of the Meiji period, the development of new technologies allowed ice to be cheaply made and stored, leading for greater consumption among various types of people. Around the same time, sugar plantations prolifically developed across Hawaii and many people from Asian countries relocated to the Hawaii islands in hopes of a steady income. The Japanese were among this immigrant population and brought with them their traditional ice-based dessert called kakigōri.

Hawaii 
In Hawaiian Pidgin, a native Hawaiian language, kakigōri became known as shave ice. Shave ice was first sold by Japanese immigrants to plantation workers in the early 1900s and became a regular product in many Japanese owned grocery stores by the 1950s. The rise of shave ice coincided with the increasing significance of ice in Hawaiian history as shown in trade agreements between the United States and the Territory of Hawaii where numerous references are made to this important commodity. Because ice signified status and provided comfort to settlers on the island, it was an essential factor in the U.S. colonization of Hawaii.

Components

Ingredients 
Shave ice in its simplest form is composed of thinly shaved ice and syrup served in a cup, paper cone, or bowl. Distinct from a snow cone which uses crushed ice, the ice for Hawaiian shave ice is thinly shaved to create a unique texture that is more powdery and snow-like. Additionally, the thin ice shavings can absorb syrups better than crushed ice. The ice can be made in house by freezing pure water in containers very slowly over a period of days, while constantly agitating the mixture to ensure impurities are not incorporated.

Traditional syrups are made from sugar, flavoring extracts, and additional coloring elements with acid incorporated to enhance preservation. Syrups are often flavored with local ingredients such as banana, pineapple, lilikoi (passionfruit), guava, lychee, kiwifruit, mango, and coconut cream. Bubble gum, vanilla, lemon-lime, green tea, strawberry, cherry, grape, watermelon, coke, root beer, and fruit punch have also been incorporated into syrups for shave ice. New syrup flavors are constantly being developed including more unusual ones such as li hing mui (salty dried Chinese plums), melona, ginger, and pickled mango. These syrups are often quite vibrant with certain colors traditionally representing specific flavors, such as blue for coconut. During the 1950s, these color-flavor associations enabled customers to order syrups by color instead of using their flavors for reference. When many different colors of syrups are combined, it is referred to as “kalakoa” which means calico in Hawaiian.

Additional elements 
Additional ingredients that lie underneath the ice flakes are often called “unders” and must be added to the cup, cone, or bowl before shaving the ice on top. Traditional “unders” include sweetened red azuki beans, fresh fruits, and ice cream. Hawaiian shave ice is also often accompanied by toppings such as mochi balls, li hing mui (salty dried Chinese plums) powder, fresh fruits, and ice cream. A “snowcap” specifically refers to topping shave ice with sweetened condensed milk.

Production 
Traditionally, the ice flakes for shave ice are made with tools or machines that are operated manually. In the Hawaiian sugar plantation fields, workers used to shave ice flakes with machetes from large ice blocks, on which they would then pour fruit juice. In modern times, while some still use hand-cranked machines, most shave ice stands use electric block shavers or cube ice shavers. Block shavers require a specific size of ice block that can be made by freezing water in specific molds. After the ice block is taken out of the freezer, it needs to be tempered by leaving it out at room temperature for roughly 15 minutes so it begins to melt slightly. This ensures that the ice flakes are firm enough to hold the syrup but also soft enough to eat with a spoon. 

A container (cup, paper cone, or bowl) should be placed under the shaving machine to collect the ice flakes, and "unders" (ingredients for the bottom such as ice cream and azuki beans) should be added before shaving. The ice block will then be carefully inserted into the shave ice machine on top of sharp blades. For some machine models, blades should be adjusted to avoid chunky ice flakes that are used in snow cones and preserve the fluffy texture of true shaved ice. The machine can be activated either by button or foot pedal. While the machine runs, the operator rotates the container and shapes the ice flakes with one hand to get the intended size and consistency. Once the ice flakes are ready, different kinds of syrup (artificially or naturally flavored) will be added on the surface. Some shave ice stands also punch holes with hard sticks in the ice so that the syrup can reach the bottom. Finally, toppings such as condensed milk and fruit are added for more flavor.

Notable shops

Matsumoto Shave Ice 

Matsumoto's Shave Ice is one of the oldest and most well-known shave ice destinations in Hawaii. Like many shave ice shops, it first started off as a grocery store in 1951. In 1956, founders Mamoru and Helen Matsumoto purchased their first shave ice machine from Japan. Shave ice sales began to rise in the 1960s with the arrival of Californian surfers, and by the 1990s, the family's shave ice store garnered the attention of many international visitors. Today, this renowned shop has been featured in news networks all around the world including Food Network and the Travel Channel. Matsumoto's can have wait times of over half an hour, and sell more than 1,000 shave ice treats a day and 326,400 shave ices in a year.

Waiola Shave Ice 

Opened in 1940, Waiola Shave Ice is one of the oldest shave ice shops still in existence.

Island Snow 
Island Snow is famous for its frequent visits from former U.S. President Barack Obama. The shop has a unique flavor known as the “Snowbama” in honor of Obama's work on LGBTQ+ rights.

Varieties 

There are many variations of shave ice that can also be found in Hawaii.

Ice cake 
Ice cake was popular in the past on Hawaiian sugar plantation camps. Unlike shave ice, the ice for ice cake is served directly out of the freezer. The ice cubes for this treat consist of a mixture of condensed milk, syrup, and water and are frozen in aluminum ice cube trays.

Snowbama 
Former U.S. President Barack Obama likes to visit “Island Snow” which is a shop that sells Ray-Bans and board shorts but also has shave ice. Based on his preferences, the shop made a flavor for him called “Snowbama” which looks like a rainbow to recognize his work on gay rights. The "Snowbama" contains lemon, lime, cherry, passionfruit, and guava.

Gallery

See also 

Shaved ice § Regions, for similar shaved ice variations around the world.
 Kakigōri: Japanese shaved ice
 Tshuah-ping: Taiwanese shaved ice
 Bingsu: Korean shaved ice
 Halo-halo: Filipino shaved ice (derived from Japanese Kakigori)
 Es campur and Es teler: Indonesian shaved ice
 Namkhaeng sai and O-aew: Thai shaved ice
 Ais Kacang (ABC): Malaysian shaved ice
 Grattachecca: Italian shaved ice popular in Rome.

References 

Hawaiian cuisine
Hawaiian desserts
Ice-based desserts